The 2020–21 season is the FC Barcelona's 94th in existence and the club's 56th consecutive season in the top flight of Spanish basketball and the 22nd consecutive season in the EuroLeague. It is the first season under head coach Šarūnas Jasikevičius.

Times up to 24 October 2020 and from 28 March 2021 are CEST (UTC+2). Times from 25 October 2020 to 27 March 2021 are CET (UTC+1).

Overview

Pre-season
FC Barcelona joined the group of teams that started training camp when players gathered for the first practice on August 8. Coach Šarūnas Jasikevičius gathered his team at the Palau Blaugrana, starting to get ready for the 2020–21 season.

Jasikevičius had seven players available for the beginning of training - Thomas Heurtel, Nick Calathes, Leandro Bolmaro, Sergi Martínez, Rolands Šmits, Aleix Font and Artem Pustovyi. The rest of the players underwent medical tests on August 14 and then join practice. Calathes is one of the few major additions to the team along with Brandon Davies in the first season under Jasikevičius. Barcelona opened its EuroLeague season on October 1 at home against CSKA Moscow.

Players

Squad information

Depth chart

Transactions

In

|}

Out

|}

Pre-season and friendlies

Friendly matches

Lliga Catalana

Competitions

Overview

Liga ACB

League table

Results summary

Results by round

Matches

ACB Playoffs

Quarterfinals

Semifinals

Finals

EuroLeague

League table

Results summary

Results by round

Matches

Quarterfinals

Final Four

Copa del Rey

Quarterfinals

Semifinals

Final

Supercopa de España

Semifinals

Final

References

External links
 

 
Barcelona
Barcelona